The Women's Draughts-64 World Championship has been organized by the World Draughts Federation (FMJD) since 1993 for Brazilian and Russian draughts. The first and almost other championships was held in Russian draughts. In Brazilian draughts was held championship in 2007 and in 2018.

Since 2003 took place Draughts-64 World Championship in formats blitz (3 min + 2 sec) and rapid (7 min + 5 sec) also.

Classic

Rapid

Blitz

References

External links 
World Women Championship//section-64 FMJD
World Women Championship 2009
World Women Championship 2011

Draughts world championships